Terra Naomi is an indie folk singer-songwriter, who rose to fame through a performance of her song "Say It's Possible" on the video sharing site YouTube. Originally from New York State, but currently based in Los Angeles, she writes and performs her own songs, and plays the guitar and piano.

Biography
Naomi was born in Saratoga Springs, New York and raised on a farm for the first couple of years of her life. The family then moved to Cleveland, Ohio  where they lived for six years before finally settling in upstate New York, from where her father, a plastic surgeon, originated. Her mother is a social worker. Naomi has one older brother and one younger brother.

Classical beginnings
Naomi studied classical piano and voice, attending Interlochen Performing Arts Camp in Michigan and Belvoir Terrace Summer Camp in Lenox, Massachusetts. Teachers convinced her to pursue a degree in opera from The University of Michigan. During this time, Naomi also participated in the Aspen Opera Theater Program.

Change in direction
Naomi moved to New York City after college and began writing songs. During this time, she also started playing guitar. She played at various clubs in Manhattan, including The Bitter End, The Sidewalk Cafe and The Living Room. Following a tour of the US in 2003, which started in New York and ended at the Bumbershoot Festival in Seattle, she moved to Los Angeles to work with the producer Paul Fox (XTC, 10,000 Maniacs, Sixpence None the Richer, Edwin McCain, Phish, The Sugarcubes).

Naomi has come to prominence in the international YouTube community where she broadcast her own "virtual" summer tour during 2006. The program included live performances from her apartment in Hollywood and question-answer sessions entitled "Ask a Wanna-be Rockstar". Her song, "Say It's Possible", filmed in Terra's Hollywood apartment, recorded on a Sony Handycam, appeared on YouTube in June 2006, causing an instant explosion of interest. "Say It's Possible" has inspired adoring fans to post hundreds of personal "YouTube covers" in a wide range of styles. This includes versions from countries in South America, North America and Europe. Fans have also translated and performed the song into Spanish, Italian and Mandarin Chinese and one used a sock puppet. In March 2007, she received one of the inaugural YouTube Video Awards in the music video category for "Say It's Possible", earning her appearances on NBC's The Today Show and CBS' The Early Show, as well as coverage on several international news programs.

Naomi has also been featured in articles for CNBC, Reuters, The Los Angeles Times, The LA Weekly, The Washington Post, Salon.com, and The Sunday Times (UK).

In fall 2006, Naomi was signed to a publishing deal with Universal Music Publishing Group. This was followed in January 2007 by the announcement that she had been also signed to the major record label, Island Records.

After releasing Under the Influence, Naomi left Island Records. She released her new album, To Know I'm Ok, independently in June 2011. It was funded through fans via Pledgemusic, an "international Direct-to-Fan platform for raising funds".

Tours and notable performances

Naomi headlined national tours in the United States in 2003, 2004, and 2005, which included dates at the Chicago House of Blues, NYC's Irving Plaza, The Trocadero in Philadelphia, The Abbey in Chicago, The Gypsy Tea Room in Dallas and The Hotel Cafe in Los Angeles and has also performed shows in Canada and the United Kingdom. Shows in the United Kingdom included an appearance at the In The City festival in Manchester . She has also opened for Tyler Hilton, Michael Bolton, Jay Brannan, The Fray, Martha Wainwright and Natasha Bedingfield.

In 2007, after being invited by Al Gore, Naomi performed "Say It's Possible" at the UK leg of Live Earth at Wembley Stadium in London. Later that year, YouTube Russia was launched and Naomi was invited to perform and help launch it.

In November 2009, Naomi began a two-week tour of India playing shows in Mumbai, Bangalore and Delhi culminating with a headlining performance at the Mercy Corps Say It's Possible Climate Change Concert in Srinagar, Kashmir. This tour was sponsored by American Center, Levi Strauss & Co. India, Fabindia and Mercy Corps. Naomi's Indian tour was followed by two weeks in Italy playing shows in Fabriano, Perugia, Rome, Imola, Bologna, Rimini, Monte Castello Di Vibio and Montesilvano. During her stay in Italy she also recorded a duet with Italian singer Elisa.

In early July 2010, Naomi performed at Lilith Fair's San Francisco show after winning a competition sponsored by OurStage.com. In August, she toured Italy again, playing in Rimini, Milano, Padova, Montepulciano and Castiglione del Lago.

In June 2011, Naomi performed the inaugural show for the Haus of Hipstamatic Unplugged Summer Sessions in San Francisco. The event was the first in a series of unplugged sessions featuring other singer-songwriters such as Michelle Branch and was hosted by Hipstamatic at their office space in SoMa. The music video for "You For Me" also debuted at the event, which is archived on Ustream. A video for "I'll Be Waiting" was also shot.

In January, February and March 2012, she toured Europe, doing more than 30 concerts. The European countries she toured include UK, Italy, France, Germany and Switzerland.

Record label 
Naomi published an essay in 2015 called "How Signing A Major Record Deal Nearly Destroyed My Music Career" in Digital Music News. The article told the detailed story of Naomi's experience at Universal Island Records.

2018

Indiegogo 
In 2016, Naomi announced an Indiegogo campaign to raise funds for her first album since 2012. The campaign exceeded its goal of $35,000, ultimately raising $51,000 from 600 people.

Album release

"Machine Age" single 
Naomi released "Machine Age," the first single from the album, via Bandcamp on January 19, 2018. It was described as both a "protest song" by INTO magazine and a "peaceful plea" by Broadway World. Billboard called the song "A poignant reflection on Trump's first year in office", Jubilant wrote "'Machine Age,' by singer-songwriter Terra Naomi may be the first truly great song to come at the expense of the world's collective sanity", Women In Rock wrote "Terra Naomi is the voice that all women need right now".

"Nothing To Hide" single 
Naomi released "Nothing To Hide" the first single from the album, via Bandcamp on March 9, 2018. The song premiered on Popdust.

Discography

Albums
Terra Naomi (2002)
Virtually (2006)
Under the Influence (2007)
To Know I'm OK (2011)
Live & Unplugged (2012)
Secret Songs (2018)

Extended plays
Live & Free (2004)
Terra Naomi (2004)
8-Track (2005)
Go Quietly (2009) 
You For Me (2009)

Singles
 Machine Age (2018)
 Nothing To Hide (2018)

Other appearances
These songs have been released on albums that were not a studio album released by Naomi.

Songs in other media

Awards and nominations

See also
Notable YouTube users

References

Further reading

I Like Music interview with Terra Naomi 2007 - ilikemusic.com
Terra Naomi winning an online video award
Non-Official French Website of Terra Naomi
Terra Naomi collection at the Internet Archive's live music archive
Sunday Times Article

External links
 
Terra Naomi's blog (archived)

1979 births
Living people
21st-century American women singers
American women pop singers
American women rock singers
American women singer-songwriters
American pop rock singers
American YouTubers
Singer-songwriters from New York (state)
Singer-songwriters from California
People from Saratoga Springs, New York
Interlochen Center for the Arts alumni
University of Michigan School of Music, Theatre & Dance alumni
21st-century American singers